Barrhead (New) was one of four railway stations in Barrhead, Renfrewshire, Scotland.

History 

The station was originally part of the Paisley and Barrhead District Railway. The line was opened in 1897 and used for freight until the 1960s but none of the stations including this one opened for passenger travel.

It was adjacent to the Arthurlie Inn (shown with railway bridge on picture) in Cross Arthurlie Street and described as a grand building, a towering edifice with its name picked out in metal letters attached to metal strips. It might have passed as a picture house.

References

Notes

Sources 
 
 

Disused railway stations in East Renfrewshire
Unbuilt railway stations in the United Kingdom
Barrhead